Pantangi or Panthangi is a village in Nalgonda district in Telangana, India. It falls under Choutuppal mandal. It is on the National Highway 9 and is 55 kilometers from Hyderabad.

Schools

There is a Zilla Parishad High School here. Surendhar Lingaiah rodda studied here in 1980 s and went on to become Senior Manager in BANK OF BARODA.

Commercial area
Nile Limited has its plant here.

NH 9 first toll gate is located here.

Temples

Panthangi chanigala gutta shri laxmi narasimha swamy temple is located here.

Banks

State bank of India has opened a branch here.

References

Villages in Nalgonda district